"All My Trials" is a folk song which became popular during the social protest movements of the late 1950s and 1960s. Alternative titles it has been recorded under include "Bahamian Lullaby" and "All My Sorrows." The origins of the song are unclear, as it appears to not have been documented in any musicological or historical records (such as the Roud Folk Song Index, Archive of American Folk Song, or an ethnomusicologist's field recordings or notes) until after the first commercial recording was released (as "Bahamian Lullaby") on Bob Gibson's 1956 debut album Offbeat Folksongs.

History 

In the first commercial release on the 1956 album Offbeat Folksongs, Gibson did not mention the history of the song. The next two artists to release it, Cynthia Gooding (as "All My Trials" in 1957) and Billy Faier (as "Bahaman Lullaby" in 1959), both wrote in their albums' liner notes that they each learned the song from Erik Darling. Gooding explained it was "supposed to be a white spiritual that went to the British West Indies and returned with the lovely rhythm of the Islands," presumably as told to her by Darling. Faier wrote that he heard Darling sing the song "four or five times in spring 1954," when Darling would have been performing with his folk group The Tarriers. However, bibliographic folk song indexes, such as the Traditional Ballad Index do not mention the Bahamas as an origin, listing it as unknown.

The Joan Baez Songbook (published 1964; Baez released the song as "All My Trials" in 1960) suggests it began as a pre-Civil War era American Southern gospel song, which was introduced to the Bahamas where it became a lullaby, and was forgotten in the US until it was brought back from the Bahamas and popularized during the roots revival.

Analysis 
The song tells the story of a mother on her death bed, comforting her children, "Hush little baby, don't you cry./You know your mama's bound to die," because, as she explains, "All my trials, Lord,/Soon be over." The message — that no matter how bleak the situation seemed, the struggle would "soon be over" — propelled the song to the status of an anthem, recorded by many of the leading artists of the era.

The song is usually classified as a Spiritual because of its biblical and religious imagery. There are references to the "Lord", "a little book" with a message of "liberty", "brothers", "religion", "paradise", "pilgrims" and the "tree of life" awaiting her after her hardships, referred to as "trials".  There is an allegory of the river Jordan, the crossing of which represents the Christian experience of death as something which "...chills the body but not the soul." The river/death allegory was popularized by John Bunyan in his classic, The Pilgrim's Progress and the wording echoes the teaching of Jesus, to "...fear not them which kill the body, but are not able to kill the soul." (Matthew 10:28)

Chart appearances 
In February 1964, Dick and Dee Dee's debuted at No. 89 on the Billboard Hot 100 and stayed on the chart for three weeks.
In August 1971, Ray Stevens released a version of the song which stayed on the Hot 100 for six weeks, peaking at No. 70 and stayed on the Easy Listening charts for eight weeks, peaking at No. 6.
In December 1990, Paul McCartney's live version of "All My Trials" debuted at No. 35 and spent six weeks on the UK Singles Chart.

Versions
 The song was recorded numerous times by folk artists, including Harry Belafonte, Bob Gibson, Pete Seeger, Dave Van Ronk, Anita Carter, Joan Baez, The Seekers, Peter, Paul and Mary, Nick and Gabrielle Drake, and The Kelly Family among many others.
Pop and rock artists have also released interpretations of the song, including Paul McCartney (1990 ; issued as a single and included on the British "Highlights" version of the Tripping the Live Fantastic live album), Dick and Dee Dee, Ray Stevens, and Cerys Matthews
 Another version of the song, "All My Sorrows", was made popular by the Kingston Trio, who recorded it in 1959, followed by The Shadows in 1961 and The Searchers in 1963 on Sugar and Spice
 The melody and chord changes were used as the basis of the Brandywine Singers' "Summer's Come and Gone" (Billboard No. 129, 1963).
 Swedish folk group The Hootenanny Singers released a Swedish language version titled "Stanna en stund" ("Pause for a moment") in 1964.
 A fragment of the song is used in the Mickey Newbury anthem "An American Trilogy", also recorded by Elvis Presley.
 Fleetwood Mac guitarist Lindsey Buckingham did his own arrangement of the Kingston Trio's "All My Sorrows" on his 1992 solo album Out of the Cradle.
 Swedish folk duo First Aid Kit released a version as a bonus track on their 2010 album The Big Black and the Blue.

References

1956 songs
1964 singles
1990 singles
Peter, Paul and Mary songs
Joan Baez songs
Ray Stevens songs
The Kingston Trio songs
Dick and Dee Dee songs
Paul McCartney songs
Warner Records singles
Live singles
American folk songs
Year of song unknown
Songwriter unknown